Acquigny is a commune in the Eure department in Normandy in northern France. The 16th century Château d'Acquigny is located here.

Population

See also
Communes of the Eure department

References

External links

Acquigny Official Site

Communes of Eure